The Maserati Karif (Tipo AM339) is a luxury coupé produced by Italian automobile manufacturer Maserati between 1988 and 1991. It was designed to be luxurious, but also sporty and agile to allow the driver to "feel like a racing driver again or for the first time".
At the car's unveiling, Alejandro de Tomaso declared a very limited production run of 250 examples. In the end, only 221 units were sold over the time the car was built. Production dates are not entirely clear, but the last cars were sold late in the summer of 1992, long after they had been built.

In a throwback to Maserati's earlier naming practices for two-seater GTs, the car was named after the wind called "Karif", which blows South West across the Gulf of Aden at Berbera, Somalia.

The Karif was built on the same shortened chassis as the Zagato-bodied Maserati Spyder model, adding a fixed notchback coupé roof. According to Maserati, the Karif could accelerate to 100 km/h (62 mph) from a standstill in 4.8 seconds, and achieve a top speed of over 255 km/h (158 mph). With these lower power outputs, claimed top speeds were  respectively. The rear limited-slip differential was a Ranger unit manufactured by GKN, while the 5-speed manual transmission was a ZF dog-leg unit.

References

External links 
Official Maserati Heritage pages: The Maserati Karif

Karif
Rear-wheel-drive vehicles
1990s cars
Cars introduced in 1988
Cars discontinued in 1991